Franklinton is a town in Franklin County, North Carolina, United States. The population was 2,456 at the 2020 census.

History

Franklinton, was established as Franklin Depot in 1839 on land owned by Shemuel Kearney (1791–1860), son of Crawford Kearney and Nancy White. A home constructed by grandfather Shemuel Kearney (1734–1808) was originally located south of town and is currently the second oldest residence in Franklin County, built in 1759. The building was purchased in 2009 and moved to nearby Louisburg for restoration. Franklin Depot changed its name to Franklinton in 1842 when the town was incorporated. Like Franklin County, Franklinton was named for Benjamin Franklin.

According to many locals, Trinity College, originally located in Trinity, was initially planned and approved to be moved to Franklinton in 1889. Generous offers though by local businessmen Washington Duke and Julian S. Carr brought the college to the city of Durham in 1892. This well known school is now called Duke University.  A source from the University Archives states that nearby Raleigh was actually the initial approved bidder. This does not mean Franklinton wasn't included as a possible site even though no other bidding communities are mentioned. The citizens of Raleigh offered land now occupied by North Carolina State University and pledged $35,000.00 for a new building which was quickly approved by the Methodist Conference for Trinity College. It eventually lost to a higher bid of $85,000.00 plus donations in 1890.

In December 1919, an African-American veteran of World War I named Powell Green got involved in an altercation with a white man named R.M. Brown over smoking in the movie theater, and Green allegedly killed Brown. The police arrested Green, but then a lynch mob seized him, pulled him behind a car for two miles, and hung him from a tree.

Franklinton was once home to Albion Academy, a co-educational African-American school started by clergyman Moses A. Hopkins in 1879.  Once a State Normal & Industrial School (trade school), it eventually became a graded school and later merged with the B.F. Person School in 1957 to become B.F. Person-Albion High School. When schools were fully integrated, the upper grades consolidated with Franklinton High School in 1969. Mary Little was the first African-American teacher to begin teaching at the newly integrated Franklinton High School, who taught there till her death in 1984. The B.F. Person-Albion High School was renamed Franklinton Elementary School.

Also located in Franklinton is the historic Sterling Cotton Mill, founded by Samuel C. Vann and first opened in 1895.  Remaining in the Vann family for many years, the mill was purchased in 1972 by Union Underwear Company, manufacturers of Fruit of the Loom fabric products. Sterling Cotton Mill eventually closed in 1991.  It was placed on the National Register of Historic Places in 1996.

Burlington Industries, another well known textile and fabric maker at the time, had a facility located in Franklinton known as Vamoco Mills. It closed in 1989, and was demolished in 2007. A third mill was also located in Franklinton which has since closed.

On June 10, 1946, former heavyweight champion Jack Johnson died in a car crash on U.S. Highway 1 in Franklinton.

There were a couple homes which were damaged during that event. U.S. Highway 1 was temporarily closed adjacent to the affected area while firefighters battled the fires. No injuries were reported. High winds and dry conditions were factors in both incidents.

In 1996 Franklinton, North Carolina became the home of Opio Holy Spirit Academy a private school providing an academic arena for both academically gifted and students who face academic challenges from grades k-12. The school was established and directed by Lenora E. Attles-Allen a former elementary school teacher from Boston, Massachusetts. Allen's work became known and respected in Wake, Granville, Vance, and Franklin counties as well as her dedication to the Franklin County Community Restitution Program. Opio Holy Spirit Academy closed its doors for the last time after the final High School commencement ceremony in 2012.

Charles Draughn III was elected to the mayoral position of Franklinton for 8 years, from 1987 to 1995. He is currently working with family law.  He was followed in office by Larry Kearney from 1995 to 2003, Jenny McGhee Edwards from 2003 to 2007 and Elic Senter from 2007 to 2015. Current Mayor Art Wright was elected in 2015.

Franklinton has been a Tree City USA community since 1985.

In addition to the Sterling Cotton Mill, the Franklinton Depot, Dr. J. H. Harris House, Shemuel Kearney House, C.L. and Bessie G. McGhee House, Person-McGhee Farm, Dr. J. A. Savage House, and Aldridge H. Vann House are listed on the National Register of Historic Places.  All properties are privately owned and should be respected.

Geography
Franklinton is located at  (36.102635, −78.453157).

The center of town is at Main Street (U.S. Highway 1A) and Mason Street. Green Street (N.C. Highway 56) passes just south of that point and U.S. Highway 1 bypasses Franklinton to the west.

A railway operated by CSX Transportation currently passes through Franklinton, which is part of the old Seaboard Coast Line Railroad "S-Line". The two lines were taken over by Seaboard Air Line Railroad in 1900. From 1985 to 1988, the Franklin County Railroad operated the branch line from Franklinton to Louisburg. The section was sold to the North Carolina Department of Transportation in 1990 and the tracks removed a few years later.

Demographics

2020 census

As of the 2020 United States census, there were 2,456 people, 883 households, and 602 families residing in the town.

2010 census
As of the census of 2010, there were 2,023 people, 876 households, and 551 families residing in the town. The population density was 1,264.4 people per square mile (493.4/km2). The racial makeup of the town was 55.8% White, 40.8% African American, 0.1% Native American, 0.2% Asian, 0.0% Pacific Islander, 0.7% from other races, and 2.3% from two or more races. Hispanic or Latino of any race were 4.1% of the population.

There were 876 households, out of which 23.2% had children under the age of 18 living with them, 35.8% were married couples living together, 21.7% had a female householder with no husband present, and 37.1% were non-families. 33.1% of all households were made up of individuals, and 16.1% had someone living alone who was 65 years of age or older. The average household size was 2.31 and the average family size was 2.92.

In the town, the population was spread out, with 25.7% under the age of 20, 8.3% from 20 to 24, 24.9% from 25 to 44, 21.4% from 45 to 64, and 19.8% who were 65 years of age or older. The median age was 41.4 years. For every 100 females, there were 84.4 males. For every 100 females age 18 and over, there were 80.2 males.

The median income for a household in the town was $30,082, and the median income for a family was $37,656. Males had a median income of $38,015 versus $33,380 for females. The per capita income for the town was $18,193. About 31.9% of families and 36.1% of the population were below the poverty line, including 62.7% of those under age 18 and 18.3% of those age 65 or over.

Housing
There were 1,008 housing units at an average density of 630.0 per square mile (245.9/km2). 13.1% of housing units were vacant.

There were 876 occupied housing units in the town. 553 were owner-occupied units (63.1%), while 323 were renter-occupied (36.9%). The homeowner vacancy rate was 4.1% of total units. The rental unit vacancy rate was 6.9%.

Government
Franklinton is governed by a mayor and five-member Board of Commissioners, who are elected in staggered four-year terms.

Elected officials :
Mayor: Arthur L. Wright
Commissioner: Anita Fuller
Commissioner: John Allers
Commissioner: LaTasha Wilder
Commissioner: Judy McArn
Commissioner: Alvin Holden

Town Manager: Zachary Steffey

Notable people 

 Henry Bibby, Basketball player and NBA coach
 Jim Bibby, Baseball player, Henry's brother
 Wilbur Wade Card, Baseball player, first basketball coach and athletic director at Duke University
 Jason Michael Carroll, Country music singer
 Thomas O. Fuller State senator
 Moses A. Hopkins, Diplomat, clergyman, educator
 Abby House, Eccentric supporter of Confederate soldiers
 Wilmont Perry, NFL Football Player, NCAA Division II Football Player of the Year
 Soupy Sales, Comedian, born Milton Supman
 Gene Wooten, Bluegrass musician. Born 1953 and played in Nashville TN with The Osborne Brothers

References

 Franklinton Township Chamber of Commerce, Inc. Franklinton: Credits. Retrieved Jun. 21, 2007.
 Franklinton, North Carolina; Town of Franklinton (1992). A Walk Through History:  A Town Called Franklinton Celebrates Its 150th. Edited by Cheryl Faye Hollar. Cypress Creek Publications. Library of Congress Card Catalog #92-003897.
 WRAL TV 5 (Raleigh, NC). Franklinton: Credits. Retrieved Feb. 11, 2008.
 WNCN TV 17 (Raleigh, NC). Franklinton: Credits. Retrieved Feb. 11, 2008.
 Unforgivable Blackness: The Rise and Fall of Jack Johnson

External links

 Official town website

Populated places established in 1839
Towns in Franklin County, North Carolina
Towns in North Carolina
1839 establishments in North Carolina